Eugoa nata is a moth of the family Erebidae. It is found in Cambodia.

References

 Natural History Museum Lepidoptera generic names catalog

nata
Moths described in 2013